The Skyliner is a train service between Tokyo and Narita Airport.

Skyliner may also refer to:
 Disney Skyliner, a gondola system at Walt Disney World
 Ford Skyliner (disambiguation), various motor vehicles produced by Ford
 Neoplan Skyliner, a range of coaches produced by Neoplan
 Skyliner (roller coaster), Pennsylvania, USA
 Skyliner (band), a heavy metal band from Florida, USA
 "Skyliner", a jazz instrumental recorded by Charlie Barnet
 "Skyliner", a song by Boards of Canada on the EP Trans Canada Highway
 "Skyliner", a British big band associated with the 95th Bomb Group Heritage Association at the former RAF Horham
 Sky Liner (film), a 1949 American film directed by William A. Berke

See also 
 Skyline (disambiguation)
 Skylines (disambiguation)
 Skyliners (disambiguation)